Olav Gjærevoll (24 September 1916 – 30 August 1994) was a Norwegian botanist and politician for the Labour Party. Gjærevoll was a professor of botany at the University of Trondheim from 1958 to 1986, and was a specialist in alpine plants. In politics, he served as Minister of Social Affairs from February to August 1963 and again from September 1963 to October 1965; as the last Minister of Pay and Prices from 1971 to 1972 and as the first Minister of the Environment from May to October 1972. He also served as Mayor of Trondheim from 1958 to 1963 and again from 1980 to 1981.

Biography 
He was born in Tynset.

He held a variety of minister positions in different Norwegian cabinets. He was Minister of Social Affairs in 1963 and 1963–1965, interrupted by the short-lived cabinet Lyng, Minister of Wages and Prices in the first cabinet Bratteli 1971–1972 and then the first Minister of the Environment in 1972.

As an elected politician he was elected to the Storting from Sør-Trøndelag in 1965. He had previously served in the position of deputy representative during the terms 1958–1961 and 1961–1965. On the local level he was a member of Trondheim city council from 1951 to 1963, 1967 to 1968 and 1979 to 1987, serving as mayor for two periods 1958–1963 and 1979–1981.

References

 Olav Gjærevoll private archive is kept at NTNU University Library

External links

1916 births
1994 deaths
People from Tynset
Government ministers of Norway
Ministers of Climate and the Environment of Norway
Mayors of Trondheim
Members of the Storting
Labour Party (Norway) politicians
University of Oslo alumni
Uppsala University alumni
Academic staff of the Norwegian University of Science and Technology
20th-century Norwegian botanists
20th-century Norwegian politicians
Royal Norwegian Society of Sciences and Letters